G26 may refer to:

 , a De Soto County-class tank landing ship of the Brazilian Navy
 EMD G26, an American locomotive
 Gribovsky G-26, a Soviet aircraft
 Glock 26, a firearm
 , an S-class destroyer of the Royal Norwegian Navy